The River Aller is a small river on Exmoor in Somerset, England.

It rises as several small streams around Tivington and Huntscott and flows through the Holnicote Estate passing Holnicote and through Allerford, where it passes under a packhorse bridge of medieval origin. It then joins the River Horner, which flows into Porlock Bay near Hurlstone Point on the Bristol Channel.

Because of the surrounding geology the area has been at risk of flooding. To help manage this risk telemetry monitoring of flows and a siren warning system have been proposed.

References

Rivers of Somerset
Exmoor